Portroe is a village in County Tipperary, Ireland. The village is located on the R494 regional road, 3 km from the eastern shore of Lough Derg and 10 km west of the town of Nenagh. Portroe spans the townlands of Garrykennedy, Glencrue and Shesharoe.

Transport

Bus Éireann route 323 serves the village. It travels to and from Limerick and Nenagh.

Sport
Portroe GAA is the local Gaelic Athletic Association club. A senior hurling team, representing Portroe, won their first ever North Tipperary Senior Hurling title in 2012 in McDonagh Park in Nenagh. Liam Sheedy, who played his club hurling with Portroe and inter-county hurling with Tipperary, was twice the manager of the Tipperary hurling team.

On the outskirts of Portroe is an old flooded quarry, which is used for scuba diving up to depths of 39m.

Notable buildings
The local Roman Catholic church is dedicated to St Mary, and was built in 1872. There is also a primary school, a Gaelic Athletic Association club, and a handball alley next to the old primary school in Portroe. At the top of the hill is a former Royal Irish Constabulary barracks, built c.1830. There are two housing estates in Portroe, both of which are social housing, and one ghost estate.

On Loughtea Hill, one of the Arra hills south-west of Portroe, a 20 metre high stainless steel cross was erected in 2002. It was raised to mark the millennium and to replace an earlier cross placed there following the Eucharistic Congress of Dublin (1932).

People
As of the 2016 census, Portroe had a population of 461, up from 411 people as of the 1996 census.

Three people from village have participated in the Rose of Tralee festival, with Portroe natives representing the county in the festival in 2008, 2009 and 2012.

See also

 List of towns and villages in Ireland

References

Towns and villages in County Tipperary
Owney and Arra